Andrzej Lucjan Fischer (15 January 1952 – 22 November 2018) was a Polish football goalkeeper.

Among the clubs he played for are Lech Poznań and Górnik Zabrze. He earned 2 caps for the Poland national football team, and was a reserve goalkeeper in the 1974 FIFA World Cup, where Poland finished third.

References

1952 births
2018 deaths
Association football goalkeepers
Polish footballers
Poland international footballers
1974 FIFA World Cup players
Lech Poznań players
Górnik Zabrze players
VfR Aalen players
People from Swarzędz
Sportspeople from Greater Poland Voivodeship
Polish people of Scottish descent